Steve Diamond (born 7 July 1953) is an English-born former rugby union and professional rugby league footballer who played in the 1970s and 1980s.

Background
Steve Diamond was born in Hereford, Herefordshire, England, and he worked at British Jeffrey Diamond (BJD) in Wakefield, West Yorkshire, England.

Playing career

International honours
Diamond won caps for Wales while at Wakefield Trinity in 1980 against France and England, and in 1981 against France.

Challenge Cup Final appearances
Steve Diamond played right-, i.e. number 3, in Wakefield Trinity's 3-12 defeat by Widnes in the 1978–79 Challenge Cup Final during the 1978–79 season at Wembley Stadium, London on Saturday 5 May 1979, in front of a crowd of a crowd of 94,218.

County Cup Final appearances
Steve Diamond played , and scored a goal in Castleford's 18-22 defeat by Hull Kingston Rovers in the 1985–86 Yorkshire County Cup Final during the 1985–86 season at Elland Road, Leeds on Sunday 27 October 1985.

Club career
During his time at Wakefield Trinity he scored nineteen 3-point tries and, one 4-point try.

Career Records
Steve Diamond holds Fulham RLFC/London Crusaders/London Broncos/Harlequins RL's career goalscoring record; with 309-goals scored between 1981–84, and is one of less than twenty-five Welshmen to have scored more than 1000-points in their rugby league career.

References

External links
(archived by web.archive.org) Profile at blackandambers.co.uk
(archived by web.archive.org) Newport RFC : 1976/7 Season Summary at blackandambers.co.uk
(archived by web.archive.org) Statistics at thecastlefordtigers.co.uk
(archived by web.archive.org) Statistics at wolvesplayers.thisiswarrington.co.uk

1953 births
Living people
Castleford Tigers players
English people of Welsh descent
English rugby league players
English rugby union players
Footballers who switched code
Hunslet R.L.F.C. players
London Broncos players
Newport RFC players
Rugby league centres
Rugby league fullbacks
Rugby league players from Herefordshire
Rugby union fly-halves
Rugby union players from Hereford
Wakefield Trinity players
Wales national rugby league team players
Warrington Wolves players
York Wasps players